John Bunyan Shearer (1832–1919) was the eighth president of Davidson College.

Biography 
John Bunyan Shearer was born in Appomattox County, Virginia on July 19, 1832. He completed his undergraduate studies at Hampden–Sydney College in 1851 and eventually entered the ministry. After the American Civil War, Shearer became president of Stewart College in Clarksville, Tennessee, which would later become Rhodes College. Shearer became president of Davidson in 1888; he focused particularly on public relations and fundraising. As president, Shearer spearheaded on renovating buildings and included mandatory Bible classes for students. Shearer's health would force him to resign, although he remained at Davidson in the administration.

He died in Davidson on June 14, 1919.

References

External links 
 Biography from the Davidson College Archives & Special Collections

Davidson College faculty
Hampden–Sydney College alumni
Presidents of Davidson College
1832 births
1919 deaths
People from Davidson, North Carolina